Mia Suzanne Murray (née Newley, born 4 August 1988) is an Australian women's basketball player, who has represented the country at both junior and senior levels. She began going by her married name, Mia Murray, in 2015.

Biography

Murray commenced playing in the Women's National Basketball League (WNBL) in 2006. Since then, Murray has played for the AIS (2006 to 2008), Adelaide Lightning (2008/09 to 2010/11), and Townsville Fire (2011/12 to present).

Considered dangerous at both ends of the floor, Murray’s size makes her a difficult match-up for opposition teams and her shooting ability from beyond the arc ensures that she spreads the court. In the 2015 WNBL Grand Final, Murray won the MVP award after finishing with a game-high 23 points at 50 per cent, including 3-of-5 threes, seven rebounds and three assists performance.

At official FIBA events, Murray played for Australia at the 2007 World Championship for Junior Women held in Bratislava, Slovak Republic. At the World University Games, Newley won Bronze medals in 2009 and 2011.

Murray's brother, Brad, is an Australian professional basketball player who currently plays for Melbourne United in the NBL.

References

1988 births
Living people
Australian women's basketball players
Australian Institute of Sport basketball (WNBL) players
Adelaide Lightning players
Townsville Fire players
Universiade medalists in basketball
Universiade bronze medalists for Australia
Guards (basketball)
Medalists at the 2009 Summer Universiade
Medalists at the 2011 Summer Universiade